Rocky DiPietro (born January 30, 1956) is a former Canadian Football League receiver for the Hamilton Tiger-Cats.  During his 14-year career as a slotback and wide receiver, DiPietro became the CFL's all-time pass reception leader in 1989 and had a career total of 706 receptions for 9,762 yards and 45 touchdowns. Rocky retired in 1991 after starring in four Grey Cup games, winning it in 1986. He was named to the Tiger-Cats Wall of Honour in 1994, and inducted into the Canadian Football Hall of Fame in 1997. His cousin Paul DiPietro was a member of the 1993 Montreal Canadiens Stanley Cup championship team and is now an established star in Switzerland. Dipietro's nephew-in-law, Riley Sheahan, is an NHL player for the Edmonton Oilers.

After a junior and senior football career in Sault Ste. Marie, Rocky DiPietro went on to a brilliant all-star CFL career. He was inducted into Canadian Football Hall of Fame in 1997 after playing for the Hamilton Tiger-Cats. He retired after the 1991 season with numerous awards and honours, which include: All-Eastern All-Star, All-Canadian All-Star, Most Outstanding Canadian Player Award, Lew Hayman Trophy — Most Outstanding Canadian Player Eastern Division, Grey Cup Participation, Grey Cup Championship Team and the Tiger-cats Walk of Fame.

He is now a high school Learning Strategies/Special Education teacher and coach of the multiple championship winning football team at Lakeshore Catholic High School in Port Colborne, Ontario.

Awards and honors
 Schenley Most Outstanding Canadian: 1982, 1989
 All-Canadian Slotback: 1986, 1989
 All-Eastern Slotback: 1981, 1982, 1986, 1989
 Lew Hayman Trophy: 1982, 1986, 1989

References

1956 births
Living people
Canadian Football Hall of Fame inductees
Canadian Football League Most Outstanding Canadian Award winners
Hamilton Tiger-Cats players
Ottawa Gee-Gees football players
Sportspeople from Sault Ste. Marie, Ontario
Players of Canadian football from Ontario